"Minority" is a song by the American rock band Green Day. It was released to radio in August 2000 as the lead single from their sixth studio album, Warning. The song remained at No. 1 for five weeks in a row on the Billboard Modern Rock chart in late 2000, making it one of the most successful songs from the band in the 2000s.

The song was heard on several US radio stations prior to the scheduled August 22 release date. Around the same time, Green Day was shooting the music video for the song. At the end of August, the single debuted on Billboard Mainstream Rock Airplay chart at number 17. The video first aired on September 14 on MTV's Total Request Live. A retail single was released the next day. In the UK, the single first entered the Official Charts at number 18 at the end of September, and stayed on the chart for three weeks.  At the end of October, a four-track maxi single was released on vinyl through Adeline Records.

Track listing
"Minority" (Radio version)
"Brat" (Live from Tokyo) – 1:42
"86" (Live from Prague) – 2:59

AU single
"Minority" (Album version) – 2:49
"Brat" (Live from Tokyo) – 1:42
"86" (Live from Prague) – 2:59
"Jackass" (Album version) – 2:47

7"
Side A
"Minority"
"Brat" (Live from Tokyo) – 1:42

Side B
"Jackass"
"86" (Live from Prague) – 2:59

7" vinyl box set
"Minority" – 2:49
"Warning" – 3:42
"Hold On" – 2:56
"Outsider" – 2:17

Promo single
"Minority" (radio edit)
"Minority" (album version) – 2:49

Meaning
In an interview, frontman Billie Joe Armstrong said that "The song is about being an individual and how you have to drift through the darkness to find where you belong."

Billie Joe Armstrong commented that this was the point in which their song writing became slightly more politically based. The lyrics "I pledge allegiance to the underworld, one nation under dog..." were taken from the American Pledge of Allegiance but "twisted upside down a bit."

Music video
The music video was released in September 2000 and directed by Evan Bernard (who also directed the "Nice Guys Finish Last" video). It shows the band on a parade float, playing their instruments in the middle of San Diego (specifically Broadway) followed by a very reduced number of people. There are also computer-generated balloons made to look like each individual member. In the end they destroy the float (this is typical of a Green Day music video: destruction of instruments, props and buildings can also be seen in a number of their other videos, including "Walking Contradiction", "Basket Case", "Longview", "Hitchin' a Ride". The video was released uncut on International Supervideos!. It was filmed in downtown San Diego. When he first sings the phrase "Fuck 'em all," Billie Joe can be seen giving the middle finger to the buildings to both the left and right. A rare behind the scenes video is on YouTube uploaded by user Thibaut78240 but the audio cuts out through almost the entire video.

Other versions
 A live version on Tune in, Tokyo. 
 Another live version on the CD/DVD Bullet in a Bible.
 Another live version on the CD BBC Sessions (live).

Personnel
 Billie Joe Armstrong - Guitar, lead vocals, harmonica
 Mike Dirnt - Bass guitar, backing vocals
 Tre Cool - Drums, accordion

Charts

Certifications

References

2000 singles
Green Day songs
Folk punk songs
Reprise Records singles
2000 songs